American singer songwriter Bruno Mars has recorded songs for three studio albums, one collaborative album, one extended play (EP) and three soundtrack albums. He has also featured as a guest artist and provided background vocals to other songs. After an unsuccessful contract with Motown Records and a fruitless conversation with will.i.am's management, Mars signed with Atlantic Records in 2009. He came to prominence as a composer for other artists with Philip Lawrence and Ari Levine, who called themselves the Smeezingtons. They composed B.o.B's "Nothin' on You" (2009), and Travie McCoy's "Billionaire" (2010); Mars sang on their choruses.

The Smeezingtons composed Mars's debut EP, It's Better If You Don't Understand, released in May 2010, and his debut studio album Doo-Wops & Hooligans, released in October 2010. The album included the songs "Just the Way You Are", "Grenade" and "Runaway Baby". It featured collaborations with Damian Marley, B.o.B and CeeLo Green, and the songs included on the EP, "Somewhere in Brooklyn", "The Other Side", "Count On Me" and "Talking to the Moon". Mars's love for doo-wop music inspired the album which is primarily a pop, reggae pop and R&B record. In 2011, he appeared as a featured artist on Bad Meets Evil's "Lighters" and Lil Wayne's "Mirror". He has contributed songs to soundtracks: "It Will Rain" for The Twilight Saga: Breaking Dawn – Part 1, "Young, Wild & Free" by Snoop Dogg and Wiz Khalifa for Mac & Devin Go to High School and "Welcome Back" for Rio 2.

Mars's second studio album Unorthodox Jukebox, released in December 2012, included the tracks "Locked Out of Heaven", "When I Was Your Man", "Treasure" and "Moonshine". The Smeezingtons collaborated with other producers, including Mark Ronson, Jeff Bhasker and Emile Haynie, to create a disco, funk, pop, reggae, and rock album. Lyrically, it showcases traditional notions of romance, male chauvinism, and sexuality. In 2014, Ronson's single, "Uptown Funk", featured Mars. Shampoo Press & Curl, a production trio formed by Mars, Lawrence and Christopher Brody Brown, composed the tracks on his third studio album, 24K Magic, released in November 2016. It included the songs "24K Magic", "That's What I Like", and a remix of "Finesse" featuring Cardi B. Funk, pop and R&B influenced the creation of this album, which involves subjects of money and sex.

Mars and Anderson .Paak, as Silk Sonic, released the collaborative studio album An Evening with Silk Sonic, in November 2021. Mars joined with other producers, D'Mile and The Stereotypes, to create the album. It was preceded by the singles "Leave the Door Open", "Skate", and "Smokin out the Window".

Songs

Notes

References

External links
Bruno Mars on AllMusic

Mars, Bruno